Michael Purcell (born April 20, 1991) is an American football nose tackle for the Denver Broncos of the National Football League (NFL). He played college football at Wyoming, and was signed by the San Francisco 49ers as an undrafted free agent in 2013.

College career
Purcell played 42 games (36 starts) at the University of Wyoming and totaled 197 tackles, four sacks, three forced fumbles and two fumble recoveries in his four-year career. He earned first-team All-Mountain West Conference honors as a senior after recording 83 tackles, 1.5 sacks and two forced fumbles.

Professional career

San Francisco 49ers
Purcell was signed by the San Francisco 49ers as an undrafted free agent on May 7, 2013. He was signed to the team's practice squad on September 2, 2013. On January 22, 2014, Purcell signed a reserve/future contract with San Francisco, before being signed to the team's practice squad on August 31, 2014. On December 19, 2014, Purcell was promoted to the active roster after Ray McDonald's release on December 17, 2014.

In 2015, Purcell played in eight games (3 starts) with and recorded 15 tackles (11 solo) and one sack. In 2016, he played in a 15 games (5 starts) with and totaled 26 tackles (17 solo) and one forced fumble.

On February 27, 2017, Purcell signed a one-year tender with the 49ers. On May 2, 2017, Purcell was released by the 49ers.

Los Angeles Rams
On May 3, 2017, Purcell was claimed off waivers by the Los Angeles Rams. He was released on September 2, 2017.

Chicago Bears
On September 19, 2017, Purcell was signed to the Chicago Bears' practice squad. He was released on October 6, 2017.

Carolina Panthers
On October 10, 2017, Purcell was signed to the Carolina Panthers' practice squad. He was released on October 16, 2017.

New England Patriots
On October 25, 2017, Purcell was signed to the New England Patriots' practice squad, but was released the next day. He was re-signed to the practice squad on November 7, 2017. He was released on November 22, 2017.

Kansas City Chiefs
On November 28, 2017, Purcell was signed to the Kansas City Chiefs' practice squad. He signed a reserve/future contract with the Chiefs on January 10, 2018. He was released on May 1, 2018. He was re-signed by the Chiefs on July 27, 2018. He was released again on September 1, 2018.

Salt Lake Stallions
In 2019, Purcell joined the Salt Lake Stallions of the Alliance of American Football.

Denver Broncos
On April 22, 2019, Purcell signed with the Denver Broncos.

Purcell signed a one-year restricted free agent tender with the Broncos on April 18, 2020. In Week 2 of the 2020 season against the Pittsburgh Steelers, Purcell recorded his first sack in five years on Ben Roethlisberger during the 26–21 loss. On October 6, 2020, he signed a three-year, $14.8 million contract extension with the Broncos. Purcell was placed on injured reserve after suffering a season-ending foot injury in week 7 on October 27, 2020.

References

External links
  Pro Football career stats

1991 births
Living people
American sportspeople of Samoan descent
Players of American football from Colorado
People from Highlands Ranch, Colorado
American football defensive tackles
Wyoming Cowboys football players
San Francisco 49ers players
Sportspeople from the Denver metropolitan area
Los Angeles Rams players
Carolina Panthers players
Chicago Bears players
New England Patriots players
Kansas City Chiefs players
Salt Lake Stallions players
Denver Broncos players